Jackson Topine  pronounced (born 22 August 2001) is a New Zealand professional rugby league footballer who plays as a  forward for the Canterbury-Bankstown Bulldogs in the NRL (National Rugby League) and the New Zealand Māori at international level.

Background
Topine was born in Auckland, New Zealand and is of Maori-Cook Island and English descent. He grew up in Perth, Western Australia. 

He commenced his junior rugby league for the Ellenbrook Rabbitohs in the Perth Rugby League.
Topine was then later selected for the West Coast Pirates SG Ball team, while being educated at Ellenbrook Community College.

In 2018, Topine was then moved to the Canterbury Bulldogs and moved to Sydney, Australia and continued to play junior rugby league for St. George Dragons JRLFC. Topine was on scholarship at East Hills Boys High School and was selected in the 2019 Australian Schoolboys.

Career

2021
Topine played for the Māori All Stars in the 2021 All Stars match which ended in a 10–10 draw with the Australian Indigenous All Stars.

Topine made his first grade debut in round 4 of the 2021 NRL season for Canterbury-Bankstown against the South Sydney Rabbitohs at Stadium Australia.

Topine made a total of eight appearances for Canterbury in the 2021 NRL season as the club finished last and claimed the Wooden Spoon.

2022
Topine played three games for Canterbury in the 2022 NRL season. On 25 September, Topine played for Canterbury's NSW Cup team in their grand final loss to Penrith at the Western Sydney Stadium.

References

External links
Bulldogs Training Squad profiles

2001 births
Living people
Canterbury-Bankstown Bulldogs players
New Zealand rugby league players
New Zealand Māori rugby league players
Rugby league players from Auckland
Rugby league second-rows